Tegenaria comstocki is a species of funnel weaver in the family Agelenidae. It is first published in "  (2004). Spiders of Jabalpur, Madhya Pradesh (Arachnida: Araneae). Rec. zool. Surv. India, Occas. Pap. "

References

comstocki
Spiders described in 2004
Wildlife of India
Endemic arthropods of India